Louis Rousseaux (born 26 July 1900, date of death unknown) was a Belgian equestrian. He competed in two events at the 1928 Summer Olympics.

References

1900 births
Year of death missing
Belgian male equestrians
Olympic equestrians of Belgium
Equestrians at the 1928 Summer Olympics
Place of birth missing
20th-century Belgian people